State Route 197 (SR 197) is a  state highway. It passes through portions of Habersham and Rabun counties and the Chattahoochee National Forest.  Scenic Georgia Highway 197 was used by moonshiners during Prohibition in the United States.

Route description 
SR 197 begins east of Demorest, at an intersection with US 23/US 441/SR 15/SR 365 in Habersham County. It heads north and curves to the northwest until it enters Clarkesville. At East Louise Drive, it intersects US 441 Business, as well as SR 17 and SR 385. The three highways begin a concurrency into the northern part of town. One block later, they intersect SR 197 Connector (West Louise Drive). In the northern part of town, the three routes meet Monroe Avenue, where SR 17, as well as SR 115, departs to the southwest. SR 197/SR 385 continue to the northwest until they meet Grant Street, where SR 385, as well as SR 17 Alternate, departs to the northeast. Just after leaving town, SR 197 curves to the north, before curving back to the northwest and entering Chattahoochee-Oconee National Forest. The route continues its northwestern orientation until just before it enters Batesville. In Batesville, SR 197 intersects SR 255. Just to the northeast, it reaches SR 356. Then, the highway begins its climb into higher mountains and enters Rabun County. Sites along the route include Moccasin Creek State Park, the Lake Burton Fish Hatchery, and Lake Burton. As the highway climbs to its northern terminus, an intersection with US 76/SR 2 in the middle of the Chattahoochee National Forest north of the park, the road becomes very twisty.

SR 197 is not part of the National Highway System, a system of roadways important to the nation's economy, defense, and mobility.

Major intersections

Related route 

State Route 197 Connector (SR 197 Conn.) is an unsigned route that exists entirely within the southern part of Clarkesville.

It begins at an intersection with US 441 Business/SR 385 (West Louise Drive). It is known as E Louise Street for its entire length.

SR 197 Connector is not part of the National Highway System, a system of roadways important to the nation's economy, defense, and mobility.

See also

References

External links 

 Georgia Roads (Routes 181 - 200)
 Georgia State Route 197 on State-Ends.com
 Peach State Roads
 Scenic 197

197
Transportation in Habersham County, Georgia
Transportation in Rabun County, Georgia